Elberta, North Carolina, is at the southern terminus of North Carolina Highway 705, on North Carolina Highway 211, in Moore County, North Carolina.

Geography of Moore County, North Carolina